Cristina Tárrega (Valencia, 1968) is a Spanish television presenter.

She studied journalism and started working in radio. She married the football player Mami Quevedo in 1999 and they have a son.

Radio
Radio Intercontinental
Cadena 40 Principales
Onda Cero
Cadena Dial, La caña que llevas dentro (1994)
Cadena SER, El gusto es mío.

TV
1995: Bullfighting program in Canal +
1995: En casa con Rafaella with Raffaella Carrà, Telecinco
1997–1999: Sola en la ciudad, Telemadrid
1999: Cristina, amiga mía, Antena 3
1999: Los comunes, directed by Jesús Hermida, Antena 3
1999: Póker de damas, Antena 3
1999: Crónicas marcianas, Telecinco
2000: Hablemos claro, Canal Sur
2000: Qué calor, Canal Sur
2000–2001: Debat Obert, Canal 9
2003: Día a día, directed by María Teresa Campos, Telecinco
2003: Mirando al mar, Antena 3
2004: Cada día, by María Teresa Campos, Antena 3
2005: Vive la vida, Telemadrid
2006–2008: Territorio Comanche, Telemadrid
2007–2008: Gent de Tàrrega, Canal 9

Films
Torrente 2: Misión en Marbella, by Santiago Segura, 2001

References

External links

1968 births
Living people
People from Valencia
Spanish journalists